Alexander Lwowitsch Efros is a Russian physicist. Efros is co-discoverer, along with Louis Brus and Alexey Ekimov, of semiconducting nanocrystals known as quantum dots.

Efros graduated as a physical engineer in 1973 from the Leningrad Technological Institute and received his doctorate there in 1978. He was a scientist at the Ioffe Institute in Leningrad from 1981 to 1990, at which time he moved to the West. He was at the Technical University of Munich from 1990 to 1992, at the Massachusetts Institute of Technology as visiting scientist from 1992 to 1993. Since 1993 he has been an advisor at the United States Naval Research Laboratory. There, since 1999, he has held the role of senior researcher at its Center for Computational Materials Science.

In 2001, Efros became a Fellow of the American Physical Society. He received the R. W. Wood Prize in 2006, and the Alexander von Humboldt Prize in 2008 for his work on quantum dots.

References 

Russian physicists
Quantum dots
Living people
Technical University of Munich alumni
Humboldt Research Award recipients
Fellows of the American Physical Society
Year of birth missing (living people)
Soviet physicists